Enixotrophon kosunorum is a species of sea snail, a marine gastropod mollusc in the family Muricidae, the murex snails or rock snails.

Description

Distribution
It is distributed in northeast Taiwan.

References

 Houart R. & Lan T.C. 2003. Description of a new species of Pagodula (Gastropoda: Muricidae) from northeast Taiwan. Memoirs, Occasional Papers of the Malacological Society of Taiwan, 4: 39–45.

External links
 Barco, A.; Marshall, B.; A. Houart, R.; Oliverio, M. (2015). Molecular phylogenetics of Haustrinae and Pagodulinae (Neogastropoda: Muricidae) with a focus on New Zealand species. Journal of Molluscan Studies. 81(4): 476-488

Gastropods described in 2003
Enixotrophon